Frieda is a 1947 British drama film directed by Basil Dearden and starring David Farrar, Glynis Johns and Mai Zetterling. Made by Michael Balcon at Ealing Studios, it is based on the 1946 play of the same title by Ronald Millar who co-wrote the screenplay with Angus MacPhail. The film's sets were designed by the art directors Jim Morahan and Michael Relph.

During World War II, a German woman rescues an English prisoner-of-war. He decides to marry her, though he does not actually love her. Following the war, the couple settle in Oxfordshire. Frieda has to deal with both anti-German sentiment in post-war Britain, and with her unrepentant Nazi brother.

Synopsis

Frieda (Mai Zetterling) is a German woman who helps English airman Robert (David Farrar) to escape from a German prisoner-of-war camp as the Second World War nears its end. She loves him; he is only grateful to her. In a church between the Russian-German lines, however, Robert marries her, so that she can obtain a British passport. Together they eventually arrive in his Oxfordshire home. Frieda meets his family: his mother, his small stepbrother Tony, Judy (Glynis Johns), the attractive widow of Robert's brother, and Aunt Eleanor (Flora Robson), a figure in local politics and vehemently anti-German.

At first, the townspeople are bitterly hostile to Frieda, and Robert is forced to give up his job as a schoolteacher. Gradually, however, the ill will subsides, and she is accepted, except by Eleanor. Frieda is befriended by Judy, who, unknown to Robert, is now also in love with him. As Robert settles into a new life, working with Frieda on a farm, he begins to lose his prisoner-of-war heaviness. He sees Frieda in a new light. But then they see a film dealing with the horror of Bergen-Belsen and Frieda fears their marriage will not survive its revelation of her countrymen's cruelty. But Robert clings on to what they have established between them.

Suddenly, an ex-German soldier appears—Frieda's brother Richard (Albert Lieven). Thinking he had been killed, Frieda is initially overjoyed. He had been captured and allowed to volunteer for the Polish Army. However, she soon realises that he has remained a Nazi at heart, his wedding present to Frieda being a swastika on a chain. In a pub, he is denounced as one of the guards at a concentration camp. To Robert, in private, he admits the truth of this accusation, and claims that Frieda had known and approved of his actions. They fight, and Robert now revolts against everything German as vile and polluted.

Frieda, fearing that she has lost Robert, attempts suicide, but, just in time, Robert reaches her and the shock brings him to a realisation of what he risked losing. He perceives that his faith in her was justified. Even Aunt Eleanor comes to believe that her sweeping anti-German prejudice was wrong: "You cannot treat human beings as though they were less than human—without becoming less than human yourself."

Cast
 David Farrar as Robert 
 Glynis Johns as Judy 
 Mai Zetterling as Frieda 
 Flora Robson as Nell 
 Albert Lieven as Richard 
 Barbara Everest as Mrs Dawson 
 Gladys Henson as Edith 
 Ray Jackson  as Tony 
 Patrick Holt as Alan 
 Milton Rosmer as Merrick 
 Barry Letts as Jim Merrick 
 Gilbert Davis as Lawrence 
 Renee Gadd as Mrs. Freeman 
 Douglas Jefferies as Hobson 
 Barry Jones as Holliday 
 Eliot Makeham as Bailey 
 Norman Pierce as Crawley 
 John Ruddock as Granger 
 D. A. Clarke-Smith as Herriot 
 Garry Marsh as Beckwith 
 Aubrey Mallalieu as Irvine 
 John Molecey as Latham 
 Stanley Escane as Post-boy 
 Gerard Heinz as Polish Priest 
 Arthur Howard as First Official

Reception

Box office
The film was the ninth most popular film at the British box office in 1947. According to Kinematograph Weekly the 'biggest winner' at the box office in 1947 Britain was The Courtneys of Curzon Street, with "runners up" being The Jolson Story, Great Expectations, Odd Man Out, Frieda, Holiday Camp and Duel in the Sun.

The film was released in 1948 in the United States to excellent box office results.

References

External links
 
 
 Frieda at BFI Screenonline
Review of film at Variety

1947 films
1947 drama films
Ealing Studios films
British black-and-white films
British World War II films
Films directed by Basil Dearden
Films produced by Michael Balcon
Films set in Poland
Films set in Oxfordshire
British drama films
British films based on plays
1940s English-language films
1940s British films